Grevillea steiglitziana, also known as Brisbane Range grevillea, Brisbane Ranges grevillea or  Steiglitz grevillea, is a species of flowering plant in the family Proteaceae and is endemic to Victoria, Australia. It is a low, spreading shrub with pinnatifid to pinnatipartite leaves, and greenish-brown flowers with a red style.

Description

Taxonomy
Grevillea steiglitziana was first formally described in 1956 by Norman Wakefield in The Victorian Naturalist from specimens collected by Percival St. John in 1911.

Distribution and habitat
Grevillea steiglitziana occurs in dry sclerophyll forest in the Brisbane Ranges. It is named after the town of Steiglitz, Victoria. Brisbane Ranges National Park west of Melbourne was invaded by Phytophthora cinnamomi in the 1970s. Grevillea steiglitziana (along with such species as Banksia marginata) was part of a secondary regrowth of understorey species after more resistant shrubs such as grasses and sedges had grown back.

Conservation status
Brisbane Range grevillea is listed as "endangered" under the Victorian Government Flora and Fauna Guarantee Act 1988 and as "rare in Victoria" on the Department of Sustainability and Environment's Advisory List of Rare Or Threatened Plants In Victoria.

References

steiglitziana
Flora of Victoria (Australia)
Proteales of Australia
Plants described in 1956
Taxa named by Norman Arthur Wakefield